Israel Acrelius (1714–1800), Lutheran clergyman
John Backus (1924–2007), computer scientist, Fortran inventor, Turing Award laureate
Bertice Berry, comedian, sociologist, author, and former talk show host
Valerie Bertinelli (born 1960), actress
Ashley Biden (born 1981), fashion designer, social worker, daughter of President Joe Biden
Beau Biden (1969–2015), former attorney general of Delaware; son of President Joe Biden
Hunter Biden (born 1970), lawyer, second son of President Joe Biden
Jill Biden (born 1951), First Lady of the United States (2021–present), Second Lady of the United States (2009–2017), wife of President Joe Biden 
Joe Biden (born 1942), 46th President of the United States (2021–present), 47th Vice President of the United States (2009–2017), and U.S. Senator from Delaware (1973–2009)
John Biggs Jr (1895–1979), Chief Judge of the US Court of Appeals for the 3rd Circuit (1937–1965), Senior Judge of the US Court of Appeals for the 3rd Circuit (1965–1979), and Judge for the US Court of Appeals for the 3rd Circuit (1937–1965)
David S. Breslow (1916–1995), industrial chemist
David Bromberg (born 1945), musician
Clifford Brown (1930–1956), jazz trumpeter
Cab Calloway (1907–1994), musician, bandleader
Henry Seidel Canby (1878–1961), critic, editor, Yale University professor
John Carney (born 1956), Governor of Delaware since 2017
Thomas J. Capano (1949–2011), prominent city lawyer convicted of murder
Charles I. Carpenter (1906–1994), first Chief of Chaplains of the U.S. Air Force
Kathleen Cassello (1958–2017), opera singer
Christopher Castellani (born 1972), writer
Edwin Hyland Cooper (1881–1948), news reporter and official cameraman with the U.S. Signal Corps in World War I
 William Coyne, DuPont Company executive
Victor DelCampo (born 1977), bodybuilding champion
Laura M. Dickey, US Coast Guard Rear Admiral 
Elena Delle Donne (born 1989), professional basketball player
John Dossett (born 1958), stage and film actor
William C. Drinkard (1929–2008), scientist, inventor
Sara Dylan (born 1939), former actress and model who was the first wife of singer-songwriter Bob Dylan
Mark Eaton (born 1977), professional hockey player
Herbert S. Eleuterio (1927–2022), scientist, inventor
Raul Esparza (born 1970), actor
Bill Fleischman (1939–2019), sports journalist and professor
John Gallagher Jr. (born 1984), musician, performer, actor
James Garretson (1828–1895), "father of oral surgery"
Andrew Gemmell (born 1991), open water swimmer
Charles Gilpin (1809–1891), mayor of Philadelphia (1851–1854)
Barbara Gittings (1932–2007), prominent activist for LGBT equality
Paul Goldschmidt (born 1987), baseball player
Joan Goodfellow (born 1950), film, TV, and stage actress; mezzo-soprano
Joey Graham (born 1982), power forward for Denver Nuggets
Stephen Graham (born 1982), small forward for Charlotte Bobcats
Dallas Green (1934–2017), baseball player, manager, executive
Niem Green (born 1982), businessperson
Dionna Harris (born 1968), softball player, 1996 Olympic gold medalist
Henry Heimlich (1920–2016), thoracic surgeon, medical researcher; widely credited as the inventor of the Heimlich maneuver
Bankson T. Holcomb Jr. (1908–2000), Marine Corps Brigadier General, cryptanalyst and linguist during World War II
Charles Hope (born 1970), NFL player
Cisco Houston (1918–1961), singer-songwriter
Bones Hyland (born 2000), NBA player 
Steven Ittel (born 1946), scientist
Arturs Krišjānis Kariņš (born 1964), Prime Minister of Latvia, businessman, linguist
Pat Kenney (born 1968), retired professional wrestler and baseball player, better known by his ring name, Simon Diamond
Lisa C. Klein (born 1951), engineer, distinguished professor, Rutgers University
Ellen J. Kullman (born 1956), former CEO of DuPont
Stephanie Kwolek (1923–2014), chemist who is known for inventing Kevlar
Richard Lankford (1914–2003), U.S. Congressman
Jennifer Leigh (born 1983), professional poker player
Edward L. Loper Sr. (1916–2011), painter
John Mabry (born 1970), baseball player
Bob Marley (1945–1981), musician, lived in Wilmington
Stephen Marley (born 1972), musician
John P. Marquand (1893–1960), 20th century author, novelist
Luke Matheny (born 1976), Oscar-winning director of God of Love
Sarah McBride (born 1990), State senator, LGBT rights activist, and National Press Secretary of the Human Rights Campaign
Bill McGowan (1896–1954), Baseball Hall of Fame umpire
Robert Milligan McLane (1815–1898), U.S. Congressman
Marshall Kirk McKusick (born 1954), computer scientist, author
Tom Mees (1949–1996), sports broadcaster
Kevin Mench (born 1978), professional baseball player
Meagan Miller, opera singer
Roxanne Modafferi (born 1982), professional women's mixed-martial artist
Mary Nash (1924–2020), writer
Garrett Neff, model
George Parshall (1929–2019), scientist
Peppermint (c. 1979), drag queen
Samuel Peterson (c. 1639–1689), one of the founders of Wilmington
Daniel Pfeiffer (born 1975), political activist, podcaster
Aubrey Plaza (born 1984), actress
Pete du Pont (1935–2021), Governor of Delaware, U.S. Congressman
Keith Powell (c. 1979), actor, director
Bill Press (born 1940), author, commentator
Howard Pyle (1853–1911), author, illustrator
Joe Pyne (1924–1970), broadcaster
Judge Reinhold (born 1957), actor
Betty Roche (1918–1999), singer in Duke Ellington Orchestra, jazz vocalist
Jane Richards Roth (born 1935), Senior Judge for the US Court of Appeals for the Third Circuit (2006-present), Judge for the US Court of Appeals for the Third Circuit (1991–2006), and Judge for the US District Court for the District of Delaware (1985–1991)
William Roth (1921–2003), U.S. Senator
Will Sheridan (born 1985), Villanova basketball player, American rapper, LGBT pioneer
Matthew Shipp (born 1960), avant-garde pianist
Andrew Shue (born 1967), actor
Elisabeth Shue (born 1963), actress
Susan Stroman (born 1954), Broadway and film director, choreographer
John A. H. Sweeney (1930–2007), museum curator and author
Din Thomas (born 1976), mixed martial arts fighter
Sean Patrick Thomas (born 1970), actor
George Thorogood (born 1950), blues/rock musician
Chadwick A. Tolman (born 1938), scientist
Reorus Torkillus (1608–1643), Lutheran minister to New Sweden
Don A. J. Upham (1809–1877), Mayor of Milwaukee
Tom Verlaine (1949–2023), rock musician
Rick Wagoner (born 1953), former chairman and chief executive officer of General Motors
Mary T. Wales (1874–1952), co-founder of Johnson and Wales University, born in Wilmington
Herta Ware (1917–2005), stage and screen actress, political activist, wife of Will Geer
Gloria Warren (1926–2021), actress
Joey Wendle (born 1990), baseball player
Randy White (born 1953), NFL Hall of Famer
Kathleen Widdoes (born 1939), actress
Chris Widger (born 1971), baseball player
Young Guru (born 1974), audio engineer, record producer, disc jockey, record executive; Gimel Androus Keaton by birth
Aleksandra Ziolkowska-Boehm (born 1949), author of Polish descent
Eli Da Vincii, a rapper and songwriter

References

	

Wilmington
Wilmington, Delaware